The Game Boy Micro is a handheld game console developed and manufactured by Nintendo. It was first released in Japan on September 13, 2005 as a smaller, lighter redesign of the Game Boy Advance. The system is the last Game Boy handheld, alongside the AGS-101 model of the Game Boy Advance SP. Unlike its predecessors, the Game Boy Micro lacks backward compatibility for original Game Boy and Game Boy Color games.

History
According to Nintendo of America vice president George Harrison, the idea for a smaller version of the Game Boy was first discussed in 2004. Harrison explained that unlike the traditional console development process, Nintendo was always thinking about new ideas for the Game Boy, describing it as a  "continuous process of invention". Developed under the code name "Oxy", the company tried many ways to see how small they could make the Game Boy, opting for a metallic casing that, according to Nintendo Co. Ltd president Satoru Iwata, was "unusual for Nintendo".

The Game Boy Micro was announced by Nintendo of America's vice president of sales and marketing, Reggie Fils-Aimé, at the company's Electronic Entertainment Expo press conference on May 17, 2005. The system was released in Japan on September 13, 2005, in North America on September 19, 2005, in Australia on November 3, 2005., and in Europe on November 4, 2005. It was released in China as the iQue Game Boy Micro on October 1, 2005, and later released in South Korea on November 9, 2005.

Design and specifications

The Game Boy Micro retains some of the functionality of the Game Boy Advance SP, but in a more compact form factor. Additionally, it has a backlit screen with the ability to adjust the brightness. The shape itself is oblong, similar to the style of the Nintendo Entertainment System controller.

The Game Boy Micro cannot play original Game Boy and Game Boy Color games due to design changes. While the 8-bit Sharp LR35902 coprocessor and graphics hardware necessary to run games from older Game Boy systems is still present, it lacks other internal hardware necessary for backwards compatibility. It is also incompatible with the Nintendo e-Reader and other peripherals due to similar design issues.

The Game Boy Micro features removable, decorative housing called a faceplate. Designs with special faceplates were sold as a customization feature. Faceplates for the Micro are made using in-mould decoration.

 Dimensions: 
 Weight: 
 Processor: 32-bit 16.8 MHz ARM processor (ARM7TDMI)
 Case Colors: various
 Screen: 51 mm / 2 inches, backlight with adjustable brightness.
 Resolution: 240×160 pixels
Framerate: 60 Hz
 Colors: 512 (character cell mode) or 32,768 (bitmap mode)
 Battery: built-in rechargeable lithium-ion battery, up to 5 hours of battery life with top brightness and sound or 8 hours with both features on default
 Headphones: standard 3.5mm headphone jack

The Game Boy Micro has a two-way switch on its right side for adjusting volume. By holding down the left shoulder button, the switch can also be used to adjust the backlight between five levels of brightness.

Software and hardware
The Game Boy Micro is compatible with Game Boy Advance games, including Game Boy Advance Video Game Paks.

The following games/accessories are not compatible with the Game Boy Micro system:

 Original Game Boy Game Paks
 Game Boy Color Game Paks
 Game Boy or Game Boy Advance Game Link cables
 Game Boy Advance Wireless Adapter
 Nintendo GameCube Game Boy Advance cable
 Game Boy Printer
 Game Boy Camera

While Game Boy or Game Boy Advance Game Link cables and the Game Boy Advance Wireless Adapter are not compatible with the Game Boy Micro system, adapters and a Game Boy Micro-compatible Wireless adapter have been released. Nintendo also redesigned their Play-Yan music/video adapter to better fit the Game Boy Micro. This device is able to play MP3 and digital video files from SD cards.

As with the Game Boy Advance and Game Boy Advance SP systems, there are no regional lockouts on software, so North American games can be played on Japanese or European hardware and vice versa.

Packaging
In Japan, the Game Boy Micro was released in four different base colors: black, blue, purple, and silver. Also available at launch was a limited edition version, based on the controller of the Japanese version of the Nintendo Entertainment System, the Famicom. In October 2005, Square Enix announced that they would be releasing a special faceplate, featuring artwork by Yoshitaka Amano, to promote their re-release of Final Fantasy IV on the Game Boy Advance. On November 17, 2005, Nintendo released a Pokémon version in Japan, featuring a red Micro with a black faceplate containing the silhouette of Pikachu. Another special edition of the Micro was released on April 20, 2006, which bundled Mother 3 with a red Micro and a themed faceplate. 
In the United States and Canada, the Game Boy Micro launched with two regular color choices, each sold with three interchangeable faceplates included: silver with black, "Ammonite" and "Ladybug" faceplates; and black with silver, "Flame" and "Camouflage" faceplates. The "20th Anniversary" edition was released on December 4, 2005, which was the Famicom controller-inspired version released in Japan.

In Europe the Game Boy Micro is available in four different colors, with one matching faceplate: silver, green, blue and pink. Game Boy Micro sold in Australia have the same colors (except Green which replaced by red color) as Europe.

There are reportedly no plans to sell additional faceplates in the US retail locations (as indicated in the letter page in issue 200 of Nintendo Power) or the UK. Nintendo of Europe cannot supply replacement faceplates of any kind, and the feature is omitted from the product's marketing, packaging, and manual in Europe. However, some third parties are manufacturing such faceplates for sale in the US and Europe, and some importers stock faceplates acquired from Japan. Nintendo of America used to sell some of the faceplates individually online, however they are no longer available since the handheld was discontinued in 2008.

Unit colors
The Game Boy Micro had numerous colors and limited editions.

 Black (included silver, green camo, and fire faceplates)
 Silver (included black, flower, and blue energy faceplates)
 Green (Europe only)
 Blue (Europe and Japan only)
 Pink (Europe only)
 Red (Australia only)
 Lavender (Japan only)
 Famicom 20th Anniversary Edition
 Final Fantasy IV
 Lite Blue (Japan only)
 Mother 3 (red, Japan only)
 Pokémon (red, and black faceplate, Japan only)
 Toonami

Release and sales

 The Game Boy Micro sold over 170,000 units during its first days in Japan.
 The North American release drew some criticism; with a formal release of September 19, 2005, many stores simply ignored it, some delaying it until September 26, 2005 or as late as September 30, 2005.
 According to a Q1 2007 Nintendo earnings release, 2.42 million Game Boy Micro units had been sold worldwide as of March 31, 2007, including 610,000 units in Japan, 950,000 units in the Americas, and 870,000 in other territories such as Europe and Oceania.
 As of July 30, 2007, the Game Boy Micro had sold 2.5 million units, according to GamePro. It was ranked #8 in their "The 10 Worst-Selling Handhelds of All Time".
 Generally, the Game Boy Micro did not sell well, and failed to reach the company's aim of units sold.

Satoru Iwata stated that the marketing of the Nintendo DS may have hurt the Micro in the marketplace and admitted that Game Boy Micro sales did not meet Nintendo's expectations.

The system retailed for US$99, compared to US$79 for the Game Boy Advance SP. The system was originally available in black and silver, and a red 20th Anniversary Edition was later released to commemorate the 20th anniversary of the Nintendo Entertainment System.

Reception

The Game Boy Micro's backlit screen, which is superior to the original AGS-001 (frontlit) Game Boy Advance SP model (a later remodel, the AGS-101, added a similar high quality screen to SP systems), has been praised for its visibility. Due to a finer dot pitch, the screen is more evenly lit, and the brightness is adjustable. The smaller dot pitch has also improved the apparent sharpness of the display.

The removable faceplates have also been praised because they allow for personalization and protect the high-resolution backlit screen.

See also

 Wii Mini and Nintendo Switch Lite, similar no-frills Nintendo gaming systems

Notes

References

External links

 
 
 "Nintendo – Customer Service | Game Boy Micro – Frequently Asked Questions"

Game Boy Advance
Game Boy consoles
Regionless game consoles
Sixth-generation video game consoles
IQue consoles
Products introduced in 2005
Products and services discontinued in 2008
Discontinued handheld game consoles

de:Game Boy Advance#Game Boy Micro
simple:Game Boy Advance#Game Boy Micro